These are the results of the men's K-1 1000 metres competition in canoeing at the 1936 Summer Olympics.  The K-1 event is raced by single-man canoe sprint kayaks. The heats and the final took place on Saturday, August 8.

Fifteen canoeists from 15 nations competed.

Medalists

Heats
The 15 competitors first raced in two heats.  The top four finishers in both heats moved directly to the final.

Heat 1

Heat 2

Final

The final took place in a heavy downpour that included thunder and lightning.

References
1936 Summer Olympics Official Report Volume 2. p. 1022.
1936 Sports Reference.com K-1 1000 m results - accessed September 1, 2008.
Wallechinsky, David and Jaime Loucky (2008). "Canoeing: Men's Kayak Singles 1000 Meters". In The Complete Book of the Olympics: 2008 Edition. London: Aurum Press Limited. p. 471.

Men's K-1 1000